Autohome may refer to:
 Campervan
 Motorhome
 Recreational vehicle